James Richard Todd, Jr. (born September 21, 1947) is an American former professional baseball pitcher. He played in Major League Baseball (MLB) from 1974 to 1979 for the Chicago Cubs, Oakland Athletics, and Seattle Mariners.

Professional career
Todd was originally drafted by the Chicago Cubs in the 10th round of the 1969 Major League Baseball draft. He pitched in their organization through his major league debut in 1974, when he went 4–2 with 3 saves. Shortly before the 1975 season, Todd was traded to the Oakland Athletics.

In 1975, Todd posted career bests in wins (8), saves (12), and ERA (2.29), and even received votes on the MVP ballot for the AL West division champion A's. He pitched briefly in each of the three games of the ALCS, which Oakland lost to the Boston Red Sox.

The following season, Todd's performance slipped, setting a career high in losses with 8 and seeing his ERA rise by over a run and a half to 3.81. For the first time in his career, Todd also walked more than he struck out. His decline mirrored that of the team, which missed the playoffs for the first time since 1970. The following spring, Todd was shipped back to the Cubs for veteran pitcher Joe Coleman.

In 1977, Todd fell apart, posting an ERA over 9 in 22 games giving up 66 baserunners in 30 innings. After July, Todd did not pitch in the majors and in October he was sent to the Seattle Mariners. Todd bounced back somewhat in 1978, but he still was giving up a lot of baserunners in 106 innings.

After being released by the Mariners in February 1979, he got one last shot with the team in which he'd had his greatest success, the A's. Oakland was in the midst of losing 108 games in 1979 and Todd contributed a 6.56 ERA, walking nearly twice as many batters as he struck out. He was released the following spring and never returned to the major leagues. He did pitch one season for the Phoenix Giants in 1980 before retiring.

External links
, or Retrosheet

1947 births
Living people
Baseball players from Pennsylvania
Chicago Cubs players
Huron Cubs players
Major League Baseball pitchers
Millersville Marauders baseball players
Oakland Athletics players
Phoenix Giants players
Seattle Mariners players
Quincy Cubs players
San Antonio Missions players
Sportspeople from Lancaster, Pennsylvania
Tacoma Cubs players
Tigres de Aragua players
American expatriate baseball players in Venezuela
Tucson Toros players
Wichita Aeros players